Nabapally Boys' High School is one of the top most government affiliated schools in Barasat. The school was established in 1963 by Mr. Murari Mohan Laha and others. According to local people of Barasat the school is specially known as one and only '''Boys' School.

History
Nabapally Boys' High School is a higher secondary school in Barasat, India. The first headmaster of the school was Mr. Murari Mohan Laha. On the outermost fringe of the area known as Old Nabapally, in the mauza of West Ichhapur, stands Nabapally Boys' High School. The school was established in 1963; temporarily run on the premises of the nearby Jogendranath Girls' School, to be shifted later to the school's present arena. In 1966 the school was upgraded to the status of a junior high school and some year| 
Chayan Adhikary vs kalyan Singha Roy Chowdhury|

Campus
The school is a three-storey construction with two two-storey sides housing the primary and the secondary/higher-secondary sections. At the higher secondary level the school teaches the three streams of Commerce, Science and Arts, the latter being the newest addition to the curriculum after being introduced from the 2010-11 session.

Academics
The school is a higher secondary school, from class 1 to 12. The curriculum is as per "West Bengal Board of Secondary Education"(till class 10) and "West Bengal Council of Higher Secondary Education" (Class 11 and 12). The common curriculum is followed till class 10. In class 11 and 12, there are 3 streams: Science, Commerce and Arts.

Schools in Colonial India
Boys' schools in India
Primary schools in West Bengal
High schools and secondary schools in West Bengal
Schools in North 24 Parganas district
Barasat
Educational institutions established in 1846
1846 establishments in British India